The suffix -tania or -etania (English demonym "-tanian", "-tanians") denotes a territory or region in the Iberian Peninsula. Its historical origin is in the pre-Roman Iberia. Its etymological origin is discussed by linguists. Spanish Jesuit philologist Hervás y Panduro proposed their link to the Celtic languages, in which the root *tan or *taín means department or region. "In Irish, tan (genitive, tain) expresses the idea of country, territory."

Other philologists such as Pablo Pedro Astarloa suggest a combination of the Basque abundance suffix  (as in Arteta, Lusarreta, Olleta) with the Latin root *nia used in place names (such as Romania, Hispania, Italia).

The form of demonym used by some epigraphs in the Iberian language found in coins is -ken or -sken, as in Ikalesken, which is unrelated to the Latin-Hispanic -tanus. This suggests that -tania may be a denomination of Roman origin. According to the historian and archaeologist Manuel Gómez-Moreno, the Latin suffix -tani corresponds to the Iberian -scen, For example, the Ausetanians (Ausetani) who called themselves Ausesken. The Romans also applied this suffix to other peoples of the western Mediterranean (Sardinia and Sicily), and to a lesser extent to those of the Italian Peninsula, where however the suffix -ates prevails. Before Roman contact with the Iberian peoples, there were already Greek colonies in Iberia. The ancient Greeks used the older suffix -ητες (-etes), -εται or -ηται (-etai), which would be replaced by -ητανοι or -ετανοι (-etani), according to researcher Ulrich Schmoll (1953).

Another theory, partially developed by the Aragonese jurist Joaquín Costa, relates that suffix to the Berber *ait, which means both "son of" and "the tribe", or with *at, meaning "people." This theory that supports that "aide" (aita) is a relative in Basque.

Examples 

 Accitania
 Ausetania, nowadays Osona.
 Bergistania, nowadays Berga.
 Bastetania
 Carpetania
 Ceretania
 Contestania, nowadays Cocentaina.
 Cosetania
 Ilergitania, nowadays Lérida.
 Ilorcitania, nowadays Lorquí.
 La Jacetania
 Lacetania
 Layetania
 Lusitania
 Oretania
 Ossigitania
 Sedetania
 Turdetania

Outside the Iberian Peninsula 
 Aquitania (Aquitaine)
 Mauritania
Tingitania or Transfretania
Zeugitania
 Occitania
 Arpitania, which was created in the 70s of Arpes (Alps) and -tania (imitating Occitania)
Tripolitania

See also 
 -land
 -stan
 -patnam

References 
 

tania
Pre-Roman peoples of the Iberian Peninsula
Iberian Peninsula
Iberians
Basque language
Place name element etymologies
Berber
English suffixes